Gabriel Kyungu wa Kumwanza (24 October 1938 – 21 August 2021) was a Congolese politician.

Career
A member of UNAFEC, he served as President of the Provincial Assembly of Haut-Katanga from 20 February to 21 August 2021, President of the Council of Administration of the Société nationale des chemins de fer du Congo from 2019 to 2021, and twice served as Governor of Shaba/Katanga, from 1991 to 1995 and again in 1997.

Death 
He died of COVID-19 in Luanda on 21, August 2021, at the age of 82.

Personal life 
Kyungu was part of the Luba ethnic group.

See also 

 Christophe Mboso N'Kodia Pwanga
 Jeannine Mabunda
 Évariste Boshab

References

Democratic Republic of the Congo politicians
1938 births
2021 deaths
Luba people
Deaths from the COVID-19 pandemic in Angola
21st-century Democratic Republic of the Congo people